The 1st European Rowing U23 Championships was the 1st edition and was held from 2 to 3 September 2017 at the Kruszwica Rowing Club in Kruszwica, Poland.

Medal summary

Men's Events

Women's Events

Medal table

See also
 2017 European Rowing Championships
 2017 European Rowing Junior Championships

References

External links
Official website
WorldRowing website

2017
Rowing competitions in Poland
2017 in Polish sport
International sports competitions hosted by Poland
2017 in rowing
September 2017 sports events in Europe
Sport in Kuyavian-Pomeranian Voivodeship